The Lewis Rocks are an area of rock outcrops  in extent, at the southwest foot of Mount June in the Phillips Mountains of Marie Byrd Land, Antarctica. The feature was mapped by the United States Geological Survey from surveys and U.S. Navy air photos (1959–65), and was named by the Advisory Committee on Antarctic Names for John H. Lewis, a geologist with the United States Antarctic Research Program Fosdick Mountains party, 1967–68.

Features
Mount June

References

Rock formations of Marie Byrd Land